Mordellistena cattleyana is a beetle in the genus Mordellistena of the family Mordellidae. It was described in 1913 by George Charles Champion.

References

cattleyana
Beetles described in 1913